Darwish Pasha, also spelled Dervish Pasha, was the Ottoman beylerbey (governor-general) of Damascus Eyalet from 1571 to 1574. In 1574 he constructed an Islamic building complex consisting of a mosque, madrasa, mausoleum, and a fountain, which came to be called the Darwishiyya Madrasa after him. The governor endowed the complex as waqf for Isma'il al-Nabulsi, great-grandfather of the Sufi scholar Abd al-Ghani al-Nabulsi, and his descendants to teach the Shafi'i fiqh (jurisprudence). Isma'il attracted Turkish, Persian, and Arab students there and Darwish Pasha built a mausoleum for him at the Bab al-Saghir cemetery.

References

Bibliography

16th-century people from the Ottoman Empire
Ottoman governors of Damascus